Tero Kalliolevo (born 1977) from Finland is the Nordic countries' most successful quiz player in international competitions.

In 2007 he won his first European Quizzing Championships medal in the pair competition with compatriot Jussi Suvanto behind Belgians Erik Derycke/Tom Trogh.

In 2008 he won a singles bronze medal at the World Quizzing Championships even edging out superstar Kevin Ashman. Only Mark Bytheway and Ronny Swiggers were better.

At the European Quizzing Championships 2008 in Norway he finished in 5th place (singles), even with Suvanto. Together they came in 4th in the doubles competition. With the club JFGI (Tero Kalliolevo, Jussi Suvanto, Estonians Ove Põder and Tauno Vahter) he edged out Ashman's Milhous Warriors for Bronze.

In 2009 he finished 7th at the World Quizzing Championships behind the British and Belgian world stars (Ashman, Bytheway, Swiggers, Olav Bjortomt, Nico Pattyn, Pat Gibson). At the Euros 2009 he also finished 7th at singles behind the same players save Ian Bayley instead of Bytheway, again 4th at doubles and second with the club.

References

IQA team event gold medalists
Living people
1977 births
Finnish sportspeople